Ancient Wisdom, Modern World: Ethics for the new Millennium is a book of philosophical thought written by the Dalai Lama Tenzin Gyatso and published by Little, Brown/Abacus Press in 1999..  It proposes a system of ethics based on universal principles as opposed to strictly religious ones and whose goal is happiness for all individuals regardless of their religious beliefs.

Eastern philosophical literature
Books by the 14th Dalai Lama
1999 non-fiction books
Abacus books